Manuel Santana defeated Cliff Drysdale 6–2, 7–9, 7–5, 6–1 in the final to win the men's singles tennis title at the 1965 U.S. National Championships.

Seeds
The seeded players are listed below. Manuel Santana is the champion; others show the round in which they were eliminated.

 Roy Emerson (quarterfinals)
 Fred Stolle (second round)
 Dennis Ralston (quarterfinals)
 Manuel Santana (champion)
 Arthur Ashe (semifinals)
 Rafael Osuna (semifinals)
 Chuck McKinley (fourth round)
 Cliff Drysdale (finalist)

Draw

Key
 Q = Qualifier
 WC = Wild card
 LL = Lucky loser
 r = Retired

Final eight

Earlier rounds

Section 1

Section 2

Section 3

Section 4

Section 5

Section 6

Section 7

Section 8

References

External links
 1965 U.S. National Championships on ITFtennis.com, the source for this draw
 Association of Tennis Professionals (ATP) – 1965 U.S. Championships Men's Singles draw

U.S. National Championships (tennis) by year – Men's singles
Mens Singles